Sakura Maru (Japanese:櫻丸の) was a merchant oil tanker assigned to the Imperial Japanese Army during World War II. The ship was constructed in Japan in 1943 and completed in 1944. On 10 July 1945, the ship was sunk in a torpedo attack.

History
She was laid down at yard number 301 on 9 September 1943 at the Shimonoseki shipyard of Mitsubishi Heavy Industries, Ltd. for the benefit of the Petroleum Trading Co., Ltd. (石油共販株式會社), and given identification number 51179.  She was launched on 30 December 1943 and completed 15 March 1944. On 29 July 1944, she was chartered by the Imperial Japanese Army to serve as an oil tanker; she was never commissioned and remained in private ownership.

Fate
On 10 July 1945, she was torpedoed and sunk by the USS Hammerhead in the Gulf of Thailand (at ). Fellow tanker Nanmei Maru No. 5 was also sunk.

References

1943 ships
Ships of the Imperial Japanese Army
Ships sunk by American submarines
Ships built by Mitsubishi Heavy Industries